Darius Eubanks (born July 12, 1991) is an American football outside linebacker who is currently a free agent. He was signed by the Minnesota Vikings as an undrafted free agent in 2013. He played college football at Georgia Southern.

Early years
He attended Thomson High School. He was selected to the First Team Augusta Chronicle/WJBF All-Area twice at defensive back. He was a two-time All-State pick by the Atlanta Journal-Constitution. He earned First Team honors his senior year in high school.

College career
He was selected to the SoCon All-Freshman team in his freshman season.

Professional career

Minnesota Vikings
On April 30, 2013, he signed with the Minnesota Vikings as an undrafted free agent.

On August 31, 2013, he was released.

Cleveland Browns
On September 2, 2013, he signed with Cleveland Browns to join the practice squad. On October 26, 2013, he was promoted to the active roster from the practice squad. The Browns placed Eubanks on injured reserve with a shoulder injury on August 26, 2014.

On August 9, 2015, Eubanks was waived.

Dallas Cowboys 
On October 20, 2015, Eubanks signed with the Dallas Cowboys.

On December 15, 2015, Eubanks was waived.

Tampa Bay Buccaneers 
On December 21, 2015, the Tampa Bay Buccaneers signed Eubanks to the practice squad. On January 1, 2016, Eubanks was promoted to the active roster.

On April 29, 2016, Eubanks was waived.

Coaching career

Arkansas
Eubanks' first coaching experience came in 2017 when he joined Bret Bielema's staff at Arkansas as a graduate assistant working with the defensive line.

Samford
Eubanks first full-time position came on Chris Hatcher's staff at Samford. Eubanks was responsible for the safeties in 2018 and 2019, before taking over the whole defensive backfield and adding assistant special teams coordinator duties prior to the 2020 season, that was eventually played in the spring of 2021.

Georgia State
Following the 2021 spring season, Eubanks was hired as the co-defensive coordinator at Western Carolina, but shortly after, was hired to coach the safeties on Shawn Elliott's staff at Georgia State.

Liberty
On New Years Day, 2022, it was reported that Eubanks would be joining Hugh Freeze's staff at Liberty coaching the defensive backs.

References

External links
Georgia Southern bio 
Minnesota Vikings bio 
Cleveland Browns bio 

1991 births
Living people
Players of American football from Kentucky
American football linebackers
Georgia Southern Eagles football players
Minnesota Vikings players
Cleveland Browns players
Coaches of American football from Kentucky
Arkansas Razorbacks football coaches
Samford Bulldogs football coaches
Georgia State Panthers football coaches
Liberty Flames football coaches